Portadown Football Club is a professional, Northern Irish football club that plays in the NIFL Premiership.

The club was formed in 1887 as a junior team seeking to participate in the Mid-Ulster Cup, eventually joining the Irish League with the support of other local clubs in 1924.

They are based in Portadown in County Armagh and play their home matches at Shamrock Park. The club's colours are red and white. Their home are kit consists of red shirts, red shorts and red socks with white trim on all. The Badge shows a red apple inside it. Many believe this comes from the "orchard county" nickname to the area.

The club's main rivals are Glenavon, with their matches being known as the "Mid Ulster Derby". The club also has a strong rivalry with Glentoran.

History

Junior years (1886–1924)
In 1887, the Mid Ulster Football Association was established, and in Portadown, a young group of men set about creating a football club to participate in the Mid-Ulster Cup. Early meetings were held in a dimly lit room in the Young Men's Institute in Edward Street in Portadown, where club secretary William Mullen would read the minutes by candlelight. Early matches were played at Tavanagh, Ripley's Field, Armagh Road and Old Shamrock Park which was located approximately where Clounagh Junior High School is now sited. Among the early names to turn out for The Ports were Val Wilson, who would later become High Sheriff for County Armagh; and Harry Bell, whose father owned brickworks on the Armagh Road.

The club won the Irish Junior Cup after defeating Larne at Grosvenor Park on 18 March 1899. That same season, The Ports won their first ever cup double by winning the Mid-Ulster Cup for the first time. Portadown retained the trophy the following season and the following next five seasons before the outbreak of World War I.

The junior game was very strong in the town at the time and The Ports had to compete for talent with teams such as Edenderry Arrows, Greenview (from Edgarstown), Portadown Celtic and Parkmount. Portadown is the only one of those clubs that remains today. In 1916, the new Irish Intermediate League was formed and Portadown were selected as one of the inaugural clubs for the new competition. However, they were forced to withdraw due to the clubs large number of players who had gone off to fight in World War I.

With the return of the local men from the war, the clamour for senior football was growing. One man in particular was leading the bid for the club's senior status: William A. Mullen, the man responsible for coining the phrase "The Hub of the North" which is still popular today. It came from in the late Victorian days when Portadown's extensive rail network led to all parts of Ireland.

Many of the junior clubs in that area put aside their rivalries with The Ports to back the club's bid to join the Irish League. This was in a time of expansionism in Irish Football with the league keen to take the game beyond the boundary of Belfast. The only club who were in the league at the time were current rivals Glenavon. In 1923, the Irish League was expanded from six to ten clubs with the introduction of Newry Town, Ards and Barn. Then finally, after several years of preparation, William Mullen together with Tom Dawson and his committee met the league chiefs in June 1924 and were able to present a strong case for joining the league. Their good work in winning friends and influencing people paid dividends and Portadown became a full member club of the Irish League together with the readmittance of Belfast Celtic. The nucleus of the first teams to represent the club came from the local junior clubs who had supported the bid – names such as Nisbet, Dinnan, Carraher, Boyd, Cochrane and Hunter.

Early Irish League years (1924–1932)
In August 1924, Portadown played their first senior game; the opponents that day were Glentoran. The first Irish League game played at Shamrock Park was against the champions Queens Island in a game that finished 0–0.

In that first season, Portadown finished fourth, two points behind Belfast Celtic with Queens Island taking second place, behind champions Glentoran. Along the way, The Ports played some memorable matches, including a 4–3 victory over Linfield at Shamrock Park and a 1–0 win against Belfast Celtic in the City Cup.

The 1925–26 season saw a continuation of their consolidation in the league with away victories at both Belfast Celtic and Linfield.

After only nine seasons in senior football Portadown lifted their first senior trophy, defeating Glentoran 1–0 at Solitude in the Gold Cup Final. Thousands of Factory workers took a half-day off work and travelled to Belfast by train. Around 5,000 Ports fans were packed into Solitude to witness the victory. With only three minutes left and the scores level at 0–0, William Johnston scored the winning goal amid scenes of wild celebration for ''The Ports supporters.

As the team returned to town that night, they were met by thousands of people at the railway station and toured the town in an open top bus before stopping at St. Mark's Church for speeches. Chairman William Mullen led the speeches before igniting a terrific bonfire.

Tommy Sloan trophy winning era (1932–1938)
Tommy Sloan was appointed manager in 1932 and his and Portadown's first major trophy success came in the 1933–34 season when they won the Gold Cup under Sloan's charge and won the same trophy again in the 1937–38 season before his resignation due to the coming war in 1938. He was replaced by Hugh Bullough, but would return to the club for a brief spell during World War II.

Postwar era (1945–1954)
Post-war, Portadown were in the shadow of Mid Ulster rivals Glenavon, who were undergoing their period of glory years in the 1950s that is yet to be repeated by The Lurgan Blues.

Gibby McKenzie era (1958–1977)
In 1958, the club appointed Scottish manager Gibby McKenzie. The press described him as "the fast-talking Scot with the fanatical zeal for the game who eats sleeps and breathes football" after Harry Walker's short spell in charge. McKenzie very nearly clinched that first elusive league title in the 1960–61 season with Albert Mitchell missing a penalty that would have secured the league championship against Glentoran and in the 1961–62 season, where they finished second to Linfield in these seasons and finished third in the Irish League the following season. McKenzie left The Ports for good in 1977 after his second spell in charge of the club.

Bertie Neil era (1977–1979)
In 1977, the club appointed former Bangor Bertie Neil, famed for the development of Northern Ireland legend and now Sky Sports commentator Gerry Armstrong. Neil's spell, although short, was considered successful, with another Gold Cup and an Irish Cup Final appearance in a 3–2 defeat to Cliftonville. In 1979, the club announced that Neil had left the club "by mutual consent".

Terry Kingon era (1983–1986)

After Jon Flanagan's short spell in charge, the club appointed former player Terry Kingon. His team reached the Ulster Cup final in 1985, defeating Linfield 3–1 in the semi-final at The Oval. But the serious injury in that match to star Scottish striker Billy Paton (who had scored 28 goals the previous season for The Ports) was a devastating blow.

Portadown held Coleraine to a 0–0 draw during the 90 minutes but collapsed in extra-time, losing 5–0. Paton, who had started the game with pain-killing injections, broke down early on. Deprived of his scoring qualities for the rest of the season, Portadown struggled financially and this resulted in the sale of the training ground to meet creditors' demands. Kingon did his best with limited resources and one of the fascinating features of his season in charge at Shamrock Park was the large number of drawn games involving Portadown. In fact, before he resigned in December 1986, Portadown had drawn 9 of the first 14 Irish League games, losing the other five.

Always approachable and available at all times to football reporters for interviews and team news, Kingon was always frank and honest in his post-match analysis. He left Portadown in a dignified manner ("by mutual consent", as the statement from the Board put it) and, as was typical of Kingon, in subsequent interviews he refused to blame anyone, instead accepting that he had found managerial responsibilities a lot more difficult and a lot less enjoyable than playing.

Ronnie McFall era (1986–2016)

From 11 December 1986 to 5 March 2016 the club's manager was Ronnie McFall. He signed another in five-year contract in 2009 and signed a two-year deal in August 2014. McFall brought great success to the club, winning their elusive first ever league title in 1989 and league title wins in 1991, 1996 and in 2002; he also won three Irish Cups. He was born and raised in Portadown and played left-back for the club during the 1960s and 1970s. He has also played for Dundee United of Scotland, and afterwards Ards and Glentoran, the latter where he began his managerial career. McFall was the longest serving manager in European football, surpassing Sir Alex Ferguson in 2013. McFall is one of the most successful managers in Irish league football. Following a run of poor results, McFall announced he would step down from his position as manager following a shocking 3–2 defeat to Lurgan Celtic in the Irish Cup quarter-final.

The club in the 1989–90 season finally broke the famed "Gypsy Curse" at Shamrock Park when, after coming so close so many times in the past, the club finally won the Irish League, and in the final match there was a pitch invasion by Ports fans, who were acting in disbelief at what had just happened that they had finally done it after coming so painfully close so many times. The following season was without a doubt the best one in the club's history when in the 1990–91 season, the club dominated the Irish League, nearly defeating every team in the division. They retained the title that season and they beat bitter rivals Glenavon in the Irish cup final 2–1 to secure the club's first ever league and cup double. The season after was a disappointing one as players from the first two titles who were in the prime of their careers at the time, had started to age and attendances were starting to fall.

In the 1993–94 season the club had partially recovered from this slump and were involved in a three-way battle for the title between themselves and Linfield and Glenavon. With a rejuvenated squad arguably not as good as the last one, The Ports took on Glenavon and the winners would secure the league title, however a draw at Mourneview Park would hand the title to Linfield. Glenavon raced into a two-goal lead against Portadown at Mourneview Park, and with Linfield drawing with Glentoran, The Lurgan Blues would have won their first league title in 34 years. However, Portadown scored two quick fire goals to level it at 2–2 and with Linfield beating The Glens – the Belfast side were now champions. Everything at Mourneview had now turned in Portadown's favour, who were creating chance after chance with the Ports missing the chance to win the title themselves when Robert Casey missed an easy chance, with Linfield eventually being crowned champions. For the 1995–96 season, a new crest was introduced and The Ports won their third league title that season, with Gary Haylock and Sandy Fraser the instigators in the title winning team.

Transitional period (1996–2000)
After their title win, the club lost many of their aging star players to retirement and to other clubs, and McFall is fondly remembered signing Notts County striker Vinny Arkins and "Big Vin" famously talks about how McFall refused to let him walk away from talks until he signed the contract offered to him. A generation of players such as Philip Major and Kyle Neill coming through and a few signings helped McFall build another team to win yet another league title in 2002 and losing 2–1 to Linfield in the Irish Cup Final to prevent another league and cup double.

Thereafter, club success was quite poor, with cost-cutting measures coming in and many aging players retiring or moving to larger clubs. The club's last major trophy came in 2005 when the club took on Larne in the Irish Cup Final, with the Inver Park side scoring early on before The Ports scored five goals to secure the Irish Cup.

Demotion (2008)
 On 30 April 2008, Portadown, who had been a senior football club in Northern Ireland since 1924, were demoted to the Championship as a result of the club's final application form for the new IFA Premiership (due to replace the Irish Premier League for 2008–09) having been received 29 minutes late and thus not considered. The club unsuccessfully appealed its exclusion. Due to the drop from Northern Ireland's top domestic football league, the IFA Premiership, Portadown took on intermediate status, due to the IFA Championship, which was Northern Ireland's second tier of football, being an intermediate league at the time. McFall described the time as "the toughest point of his managerial career" but kept several star players and in their first season in the Championship. The club won promotion straight back into senior football, defeating their closest rivals Donegal Celtic 2–0 in the last (and decisive) match of the season. Also, after beating Newry City 1–0 at Mourneview Park on 28 February 2009, Portadown became the first intermediate club to win the Irish League Cup with Scotsman Gary McCutcheon scoring the winning goal.

Top-flight return (2009–10)

Portadown qualified to play UEFA Europa League football in the 2010–11 season on account of being runners-up in the 2009–10 Irish Cup to Linfield. They famously defeated professional side and Latvian champions Skonto 2–1 on aggregate to advance to the second qualifying round. It was their first win in European competition since 1974. The second qualifying round first leg match was played at Shamrock Park on 15 July 2010, with Richard Lecky scoring the opening goal against Azerbaijani champions FK Qarabağ, but two second-half goals from Afran Ismayilov saw the away side take a 2–1 lead back home for the second leg on 22 July. The second leg in Baku ended 1–1 with The Ports taking the lead through a free-kick from Kevin Braniff. Despite an effort against the Azerbaijani champions, it was not enough for The Ports to progress to the next round and they were eliminated 3–2 on aggregate.

The 2011–12 season saw The Ports recover and mount a title challenge that was largely spearheaded by Welsh striker Matthew Tipton, with themselves and Linfield the runaway leaders in the race. However, The Ports''' challenge began to fade following an injury to Tipton, and Linfield finished comfortably as champions.

The 2012–13 season saw Matthew Tipton sign for champions Linfield and Portadown sent a strong message to rivals when it was announced they had beaten strong competition from The Blues for Shamrock Rovers striker Gary Twigg, who scored on his debut, although The Ports could only muster a seventh-place finish.

The 2013–14 season was a largely frustrating one of what might have been, with Gary Twigg playing a valuable part and scoring regularly, along with in-form young striker Darren Murray and some of Kevin Braniff's moments of sheer class displayed at times and the skill of Peter McMahon. The club showed form at times capable of winning the league by beating rivals Glenavon comfortably and notably beating Ballinamallard United 11–0. However, poor results against teams lower in the table meant they finished only fourth, and a falling-out between striker Kevin Braniff and Ronnie McFall resulted in the former leaving the club and moving to Australian side Port Melbourne.

In the 2014–15 season, The Ports signed Linfield playmaker Robert Garrett, Blues captain Michael Gault and reliable Blues striker Mark McAilaster. This had meant a lot was expected of the club to challenge for the title and they started the season with an impressive 3–0 win over Warren Feeney's Linfield and several wins over Glenavon and eventual champions Crusaders They also showed the capability of being champions when in a match against basement side Institute; with the match leveled at 1–1 in the dying minutes, Michael Gault scored a late, long distance effort to secure the three points. However, a shock 2–1 defeat away to Warrenpoint Town saw The Ports miss out on the chance to go seven points clear in the NIFL Premiership, and the club lost 3–2 to Linfield, with Ross Redman missing a penalty in the final minute of the match. This saw The Ports fall away in the league, but in the Irish Cup quarter-final, they took on Linfield once again at Shamrock Park. Portadown were 3–0 up after about 30 minutes. They went on to win the match 3–2.

Portadown took on Ballymena United in the Irish Cup semi-final at The Oval. Portadown sealed their place in the final by winning 3–1. With the Kop Stand at Windsor Park collapsing, the final was forced to be moved to The Oval, where they would take on Glentoran. In the league, Portadown played Glenavon at Mourneview Park with the winner being guaranteed third place and a lucrative UEFA Europa League qualifying round spot. Glenavon raced into a two-goal lead before James Singleton was sent off for clashing with Ken Oman. Portadown had levelled it 2–2 through Peter McMahon and Gary Twigg goals, before Eoin Bradley was hauled down by Ross Redman and a last-minute penalty was dispatched by Andy McGory. Portadown were strong favourites going into the final, but the final failed to live up to expectations, with virtually nothing happening in the first half. In the second half, David Scullion scored to give The Glens the lead after a controversial refereeing decision had denied Portadown a penalty just before what proved to be the only goal.

2015–16 season

The club suffered greatly financially from the result in the final meaning that they could sign no one in the summer of 2015. However, they started the season by beating the champions Crusaders 2–1 and Warrenpoint Town by the same scoreline three days later. Results declined rapidly thereafter, and the fans began to pressure the board to consider McFall's position as manager. The manager and staff were barracked by the support, and during a 3–1 defeat to Crusaders at Shamrock Park, supporters protested with a banner asking for the sacking of the manager, which was removed by the chairman, who argued with supporters. After the game assistant manager Kieran Harding, accusing Portadown fans protesting as being "...not real supporters," called them "Imposters". 

In January the club signed former Linfield midfielder Philip Lowry in the hope that fortunes would improve. Lowry created a reasonable impact, scoring from outside the box in a win over Coleraine in the Irish Cup, and again in a 2–1 win over Linfield. Things were slowly improving until Portadown were beaten 4–1 by rivals Glenavon at Mourneview Park.

The club took on NIFL Championship 1 side Lurgan Celtic in the Irish Cup Quarter Final, with the Lurgan side scoring twice in quick succession to go into a 2–0 lead at halftime. Portadown piled on the pressure in the second half to level the score at 2–2 with goals from Marcio Soares and Sean Mackle, before conceding a penalty in the closing minutes which Lurgan Celtic defender Raymond Fitzpatrick converted to send the Lurgan side through to their first-ever Irish Cup Semi Final against Linfield. The result that afternoon marked Ronnie McFall's last game as Portadown boss. He resigned following the defeat. The following day, it was announced former defender Pat McGibbon, who had come in earlier that season as the club's physiotherapist, would take over as interim manager until the end of the season, with club legend Vinny Arkins coming on board as his assistant coach. Despite only winning once in ten games as caretaker manager, McGibbon was appointed as manager on a two-year contract and helped the club successfully avoid relegation. They finished the season ninth in the league.

2016–17 season

Before the start of 2016–17 season, the club was fined £10,000 which was halved on appeal to £5,000 and received a one-year ban on signing professional contracts until June 2017 for not declaring extra payments made to striker Gary Twigg for performing coaching work over the summer. The club also received a 12-point deduction in the league for 2016–17 season for an administrative error made in relation to the contract of exiled midfielder Peter McMahon, who later left the club in July 2016.

Despite starting the season with a major disadvantage, McGibbons side produced victories over Carrick Rangers and Ballinamallard United and were narrowly beaten by many of the teams higher up in the table. However, after a series of poor results in October 2016, Pat McGibbon resigned as manager.

Both Arkins and long serving coach Trevor Williamson remained at the club with Arkins taking over as caretaker manager. Arkins took charge for the match against Coleraine at Shamrock Park, where they lost 1–0.

Arkins won his first official match in charge as interim manager in a 2–1 win against Ballinamallard United with goals from Stephen Hughes and a penalty from Niall Henderson. It was followed up with a 3–1 win over Ards with goals from Robert Garrett, Stephen Hughes and Brendan Shannon scoring his first goal for the club from the penalty spot. However, it was later found that the club had fielded midfielder Robert Garrett, who was supposed to be serving a one-game ban with Ards officials informing the club that they believed that Garrett was suspended.Ards were subsequently awarded a 3–0 win with the Ports being fined £500. Arkins left the club following a 0–5 defeat to Linfield at an extremely foggy Shamrock Park. On 5 December 2016, Portadown-born Niall Currie was appointed as manager after successfully agreeing his release from Ards with him and his loyal assistant Jay Willis joining the club. Upon his first match against Cliftonville at Solitude, they were defeated 1–0 with a goal from Levi Ives the decider. Prior to the match, it was announced that longtime goalkeeper David Miskelly would be retiring immediately due to a shoulder injury sustained the previous season after serving 12 years and making over 400 appearances with the club.

Curries first win as Portadown manager came in a 2–0 win over Dungannon Swifts at Shamrock Park. The Ports approached the annual Boxing Day derby with rivals Glenavon not being in great form with the Ports racing into a surprise two-goal lead with goals from Mark Carson and Aaron Haire. However, the Lurgan Blues had seemingly grabbed a point with them pulling a goal back within the last ten minutes and Sykes scoring a long distance free kick in the dying seconds of the game amid wild scenes of celebration from the Glenavon supporters. Portadown's luck had finally changed, however, with it later being found that Glenavon had fielded defender David Elebert, who was due to serve a suspension through yellow cards picked up in reserve league fixtures with the Lurgan side, receiving a fine, and the Ports being awarded a 3–0 win and a valuable 3 three points.

The club earned a 1–1 draw with title chasing Linfield at Windsor Park. This was followed up with another credible 1–1 draw with champions Crusaders. The club went into a game against relegation rivals Carrick Rangers with the knowledge that a defeat would all but condemn them to relegation to which they lost the game 3–2.The Ports relegation was officially confirmed following a 3–2 defeat to Ards on Easter Tuesday fixture.

Championship spell 2017–20

The summer following Portadown's relegation saw significant changes in the playing line up. The club opened their Championship campaign with a 3–0 win over Larne and a 2–1 win over Limavady United at Shamrock Park before dropping their first points in a 1–1 draw away to PSNI. The following fixture was the first defeat for the Ports in the Championship, losing 2–1 at home to Institute, the game served as a very sobering realisation for all Ports fans present that day of the Championships difficulty with the away side comfortably taking the three points against a much more fancied Ports side. The response that followed was a resounding 4–1 win away to Newry City. However the response was short lived and saw four consecutive league defeats to Dergview, Knockbreda, H&W Welders and Ballyclare Comrades with mounting pressure on Ports boss Niall Currie who had built a team who very quickly had not lived up to expectations. A 3–0 win over Loughgall served to paper over the cracks for a Saturday, before a 1–4 home defeat to Newry drew heavy criticism from the home support who made their feelings well known throughout the game and at full time.

At this point the club, who had expected winning the league and promotion as a certainty was languishing closer to the bottom of the league than the top with the thoughts of potentially another relegation entering the minds of many. The winter period however saw a slightly better improvement with the Ports picking up 15 points from the next eight games which included remarkably a 1–1 draw and a 6–0 win over Lurgan Celtic and a 7–0 win over Dergview having lost to the Castlederg side earlier in the season. Furthermore, the Boxing Day fixture saw a 4–1 win away to Loughgall which featured a hat trick from Gary Warwick with a sublime third goal sealing a great day for the Belfast man. The January period saw the Ports sitting in 6th place with the split looming and picking up 5 points from 3 games to secure a top six with a late equaliser against Larne (Sitting in 7th) scored by Chris Lavery sealing it. Furthermore, however The Ports lost out in the Irish Cup in extra time to league rivals to Ballyclare Comrades from a late.

What followed was a run of fixtures that was of huge importance which started with a 2–1 win over Loughgall with many thinking that the team had hit form at just the right time, and provided consistent results in the "next nine cup finals" a play off position would almost certainly materialise. The positivity was quickly eroded however following a 1–0 defeat away to Ballyclare Comrades in the first of nine crucial fixtures and what was the 4th defeat that season to Ballyclare. The following fixture saw a 0–0 draw with the Welders in a game where the Ports, with so much riding on every game created virtually nothing worth noting the whole day. The game saw the end of Niall Curries tenure as Portadown manager who was relieved of his duties following the result. In February 2018 it was confirmed that Portadown had made an approach and had been successful in appointing ex striker and Warrenpoint Town boss Matthew Tipton with David Miskelly joining as his assistant.

In Tiptons first game in charge the Ports secured a 1–1 draw with league leaders Institute and 4 consecutive wins followed against Loughgall, Newry City and Harland and Wolff Welders with anticipation building that a play off spot would have been very much possible. The team were positioned in 4th place needing 3rd to secure a play off place. A huge game away to Newry City followed with three points for the men in red securing a pre play off spot against Newry. The game ultimately ended 0–0 with a red card for Jamie Douglas and the visitors ultimately coming up short.

The following season, Tipton would seek to shape the Portadown squad to his liking, making a total of 16 signings notably Kevin Braniff and Johnny Flynn on free transfers from Ballymena United, former players Darren Murray and Sean Mackle returned to the club from Crusaders and Warrenpoint Town respectively. hat particular season the Ports were challenged in a big way by Larne F.C., who were now subject to significant investment and were favourites to win the NIFL Championship in 2019. The first ten games of the season would see the Ports notch up 5 wins, 4 draws and 1 defeat in what was a fairly respectable return from the opening part of the season that saw them score 19 points out of a possible 30. As the season progressed, they often failed to pick up points away from home that saw them ultimately finish in third place behind Larne and Carrick Rangers with the latter overcoming the men in red in a promotion playoff which the Gers won 2–0.

Average attendance

European record

By competition

Last updated on 26 February 2023.

Current squad

Out on loan

Team captains

 Jimmy Dykes, 1947–1948
 Charles Maxwell, 1948–1950
 Tommy Andrews, 1950–1952
 Jimmy Mulvaney, 1952–1953
 Bobby Wishart, 1953–1954
 Ray Barr, 1954–1955
 Freddie Gorman, 1955–1956
 George Casement, 1956–1960
 Wilbur Cush, 1960-1966
 Jim Conway, 1960–1969
 Bill Hainey, 1969-1970
 Sammy Lunn, 1970–1971
 Jackie Hutton, 1971–1973
 Terry Kingon, 1973–1976
 John Keatley, 1976–1977
 Sammy Lunn, 1977–1978
 Ian Donegan, 1978–1979
 Jim Cleary, 1979–1980
 Jim Smyth, 1980–1982
 Ronnie Cromie, 1982–1983
 Dessie Edgar, 1983–1985
 John McKee, 1985–1986
 Frankie Parks, 1986–1987
 Tom Connell, 1987–1989
 Brian Strain, 1989–2000
 Vinny Arkins, 2000–2006
 John Convery, 2006–2010
 Keith O’Hara, 2010–2017
 Niall Henderson, 2017–2018
 Luke Wilson, 2018–2020
 Patrick McNally, 2020-

Non-playing staff

Managerial history

Honours

Senior honours
Irish League: 4
1989–90, 1990–91, 1995–96, 2001–02
Irish Cup: 3
1990–91, 1998–99 (Awarded Final didn't take place), 2004–05
Irish League Cup: 2
1995–96, 2008–09
Charity Shield: 1
1999
 NIFL Championship: 1
2019–20† 
Mid-Ulster Cup: 22
1898–99, 1899–1900, 1902–03, 1903–04,1905–06, 1907–08, 1909–10, 1931–32, 1933–34, 1960–61†, 1962–63†, 1964–65†, 1969–70†, 1980–81, 1981–82, 1982–83, 1992–93, 1993–94, 1994–95, 1997–98, 2001–02, 2002–03

† Portadown were an intermediate side when they won the IFA Championship in 2009. From 2016 the league was awarded senior status, therefore their win in 2020 should be described as a senior honour.

Intermediate honours
 IFA Championship: 1
2008–09
George Wilson Cup: 1
1996–97†
Bob Radcliffe Cup: 2
1982–83†, 1983–84

† Won by Portadown Reserves

Junior honours
Irish Junior Cup: 1
1898–99
Harry Cavan Youth Cup: 3
1979–80, 1991–92, 2013–14
Mid-Ulster Youth Cup: 3
2015–16, 2019–20, 2021–22
NIFL Championship Development League South: 2
2017–18, 2018–19

Defunct competitions
Gold Cup: 6
1933–34, 1937–38, 1952–53, 1971–72, 1978–79, 1992–93
Ulster Cup: 3
1990–91, 1995–96, 2004–05
Floodlit Cup: 3
1990–91, 1992–93, 1994–95
Carlsberg Cup: 1
1972–73
Texaco Cup: 1
1973–74
City Cup: 1
1938–39

Friendly honours
Royal Mail Community Action Cup: 2
2003–04, 2004–05
George Richardson Memorial Cup: 2
2018–2019, 2019–2020
Ivan Marshall Cup: 1
2004–05

Hall of Fame

References

External links

 Portadown FC website
 Portadown Statistics and Results at the Irish Football Club Project
 BBC Sport – Irish Football
 NI Football Daily Website 

 
Association football clubs established in 1887
Association football clubs in Northern Ireland
NIFL Championship clubs
Association football clubs in County Armagh